Theodorus Cornelis Michael Josephus (Theo) van de Klundert (born 1936) is a Dutch economist, and Emeritus Professor of Economics at Tilburg University.

Biography 
Born in Herwen en Aerdt, Van de Klundert received his PhD (cum laude) in 1962 at Tilburg University under supervision of Dirk Bernard Joseph Schouten with a thesis entitled "Groei en inkomensverdeling" (Growth and Income Distribution).

After his graduation, Van de Klundert started working at the Staatsmijnen in Limburg (State Mining Corporation) for a short time. He realized he had other ambitions, and moved to Stanford University. In 1964 van de Klundert was appointed Professor of Economics and History of Economics at Tilburg University. In 2001, Van de Klundert retired from Tilburg University.

Since 1967, Van de Klundert has been associated with the scientific journal De Economist, initially as editor, later on as chairman of the board of editors. Since 1976 he was also active as researcher and consultant for the CPB Bureau for Economic Policy Analysis.

Van de Klundert became a member of the Royal Netherlands Academy of Arts and Sciences in 1994.

Work 

Van de Klunderts research interests were both in the field of macroeconomics and microeconomics. According to Van Gemert et al. (1989) his scientific work was dominated by the four theme's "(1) growth and income distribution, (2) capital theory, resource economics and trade, (3) controversies between Keynesians and neoclassicists, and (4) open economy macroeconomics."

Publications 
Van de Klundert has authored and co-authored several publications. A selection from his many books includes:
 1962. Groei en inkomensverdeling. Leiden: Stenfert Kroese
 1968. Grondslagen van de economische analyse. Amsterdam : De Bussy
 1979. Over macht en wet in het economisch gebeuren : opstellen aangeboden aan Prof. Dr. D.B.J. Schouten bij zijn 25-jarig jubileum als hoogleraar in de Algemene Leer en Geschiedenis van de Economie aan de Katholieke Hogeschool. With Wim van den Goorbergh and Ad Kolnaar eds. Leiden : Stenfert Kroese
 1974. Inleiding tot de micro-economische theorie : allocatie en prijsvorming. With R.J. de Groof. Amsterdam : De Bussy.
 1997. Groei en instituties. Tilburg: Tilburg University Press
 2001. Growth theory in historical perspective : selected essays of Theo van de Klundert. With Sjak Smulders ed. Cheltenham : Elgar
 2005. Vormen van Kapitalisme: Markten, Instituties, Macht. Utrecht: Lemma
 2013. Capitalism and Democracy: a Fragile Alliance. Edward Elgar.

References

External links 
Prof. dr. T.C.M.J. (Theo) van de Klundert

1936 births
Living people
Dutch economists
Members of the Royal Netherlands Academy of Arts and Sciences
People from Rijnwaarden
Tilburg University alumni
Academic staff of Tilburg University